Westminster Mall is an enclosed, two-level shopping mall in Westminster, California, United States. Opened in August 1974, the mall features anchor stores JCPenney, Macy's, and Target, with one vacant anchor space last occupied by Sears. It is owned and managed by Washington Prime Group.

Westminster Mall is situated on the corner of Goldenwest Street and Bolsa Avenue in Westminster, California.

History

In the 1920s, the world's largest goldfish farm was relocated to the area where the mall stands today. Construction of the mall began in the 1970s.
Westminster Mall opened for business at 9:30 AM on August 7, 1974, with May Company, Sears and Buffum's, with J. W. Robinson's being added in 1975 as the mall's fourth anchor store.

Three of the mall's anchors changed names in the 1990s. Buffum's closed in May 1991 due to the chain being liquidated.  By January 1993, Robinson's and May Company merged to form Robinsons-May. As a result, the May Company store was rebranded Robinsons-May, and the J. W. Robinson's was closed as one of the 12 Robinson's and May Company stores closing as part of the merger. The closed Buffum's store became a Robinson's-May Home Store in March 1993 and in November of that same year, the closed Robinson's store became a JCPenney, which had relocated from Huntington Center Mall (now Bella Terra). In 2002, the Robinsons-May Home Store building was torn down for a new Macy's. When Federated Department Stores (now Macy's, Inc.) purchased Robinsons-May and other May Co. names in September 2006, Macy's moved to the Robinsons-May building, and the former Macy's location soon became a Target. Old Navy was added as well. In 2008, the mall underwent a renovation, relocating the carousel and constructing a play area in its place. The Grand Re-opening was on November 15, 2008. In 2015, the Todai Seafood and Sushi buffet closed and Luxe Buffet replaced it.

In 2015, Sears Holdings spun off 235 of its properties, including the Sears at Westminster Mall, into Seritage Growth Properties.

Gymboree and Crazy 8 closed on August 12, 2017, as part of a plan to close 300 stores nationwide.

On January 4, 2018, it was announced that Sears would be closing as part of a plan to close 103 stores nationwide. The store closed in April 2018, making it the last original anchor store to close. 
As of January 2021, the space is still vacant.

As of 2023, Spencer Gifts is the last long-term tenant remaining from the opening era of the mall in their original location on the upper level.  They were temporarily moved downstairs during the COVID-19 pandemic.

Transit Access
OCTA Routes 25 & 64

References

External links

Website

Washington Prime Group
Shopping malls in Orange County, California
Shopping malls established in 1974
Westminster, California
1974 establishments in California